Lina Yakubova (23 December 1976 – 21 March 2011) was a documentary film producer and writer.  She was born to an Assyrian father, Albert Yakubov and Armenian mother, Karina Khachaturyan in the Assyrian Village of Dmitrovo (Qoyalasar), Armenia.  She eventually moved to Artashat with her family where she lived for the remainder of her life.
Yakubova spoke Assyrian, Armenian, Russian and English.  She attended the Erevan Institute of Theatre and Cinema.  She received her undergraduate degree in Cinematography and in 2006 Yakubova was a PhD candidate.  She worked at the Central Radio of Armenia, presenting programs primarily about Assyrians and Armenians.
During a visit to Los Angeles, California, Yakubova died unexpectedly at the age of 35.  The cause of death was reported as undiagnosed liver cancer.  Funeral services were held in Los Angeles on 25 March 2011.
Yakubova produced and wrote several documentary films about Assyrians and Armenians specifically for the two communities.

Documentary filmography

Discography

Book

See also
List of Assyrians

References

Armenian documentary filmmakers
1976 births
2011 deaths
Armenian people of Assyrian descent